Splice may refer to:

Connections
 Rope splicing, joining two pieces of rope or cable by weaving the strands of each into the other
 Eye splice, a method of creating a permanent loop in the end of multi stranded rope by means of rope splicing
 Splice joint, a method of joining two members end to end in woodworking
 Tape splice, the joining of audio tape
 Film splice, the joining of film stock
 Electrical splice, the joining of wires in electrical wiring
 Optical splice, the joining of optical fibers:
 Fusion splicing, a permanent splice between two fibers
 Mechanical splice, a temporary splice between two fibers
 Pile splice, connecting two concrete, timber or steel piles for a deep foundation
 Line splice, a splice of two cables in the telecommunication industry

Genetics
 RNA splicing, a natural modification of ribonucleic acids
 Genetic engineering, also known as gene splicing, artificially joining pieces of genetic material
 Protein splicing, a natural process where inteins are removed

Computer science
 Splice (system call), a system call used to transfer data on Linux
 Delayed binding, also called TCP connection splicing, is a postponement of the connection between the client and the server in computer networking
 An operation between two linked lists, in which all or part of one list is transferred to another in constant time by relinking
 A method in array object in programming languages like JavaScript or PHP
 An operation on array object in programming languages like Python

Mathematics
 Splicing rule, a transformation of formal languages
 Splicing of knots creates satellite knots

Media
 Splice (film), a 2009 science fiction film
 Spliced (TV series), a 2010 Canadian animated TV series
 Splice (video game), a 2012 puzzle game

Other uses
 Software release life cycle, or Software Product Life Cycle (SPLICE)
 Splice (platform), a cloud-based music creation and collaboration platform
 Splice (ice cream), an Australian iced confectionery consisting of ice cream surrounded by fruit flavoured ice
 Splice the mainbrace, an order given aboard naval vessels to issue the crew with a drink
 Splicing veins, the connection of more than one vein to formulate a long vein conduit for vascular bypass surgery
 Splice, on a cricket bat, where the handle is joined to the body of the bat